This is a partial list of Jupiter's  trojans (60° behind Jupiter) with numbers 1–100000 . If available, an object's mean diameter is taken from the NEOWISE data release, which the Small-Body Database has also adopted. Mean diameters are rounded to two significant figures if smaller than 100 kilometers. Estimates are in italics and calculated from a magnitude-to-diameter conversion, using an assumed albedo of 0.057.

1–100000 

This list contains 376 objects sorted in numerical order.

top

References 
 

 Trojan_0
Jupiter Trojans (Trojan Camp)
Lists of Jupiter trojans